Mwale is an East African surname. Notable people with this surname include:

 Bush Mwale (born 1993), Kenyan rugby sevens player
 Chanju Samantha Mwale, Malawian lawyer and army officer
 Davis Mwale (born 1972), Zambian boxer
 Lottie Mwale (1952–2005), Zambian boxer
 Masauso Mwale, Zambian football coach
 Maximo Chanda Mwale (1961–2001), Zambian comedian
 Tasila Mwale (born 1984)m Zambian singer-songwriter
 Temi Mwale, British social entrepreneur and campaigner
 Theresa Gloria Mwale (born 1947), Malawian nurse and politician
 Yvonne Mwale (born 1988), Zambian singer
Zambian surnames